Rud-e Hasan-e Olya (also Romanized as Rūd-e Ḩasan-e ‘Olyā and Rūd Ḩasan-e ‘Olyā; also known as Kaleh Mar Olya, Kalleh Mār, Kallehmār-e Bālā, and Kalleh Mār-e ‘Olyā) is a village in Shaban Rural District, in the Central District of Nahavand County, Hamadan Province, Iran. At the 2006 census, its population was 389, in 104 families.

References 

Populated places in Nahavand County